Motor Yacht A (MY A) is a superyacht designed by Philippe Starck and engineered by naval architect Martin Francis. It was built by the Blohm + Voss shipyard at the HDW deepwater facility in Kiel. It was ordered in November 2004, and delivered in 2008 at a rumoured cost of US$300 million. It is owned by Russian entrepreneur and industrialist Andrey Melnichenko.

Design and development

"A" was designed by Philippe Starck. According to Boat International, "the design for what would become the world’s most talked about superyacht bubbled into Starck’s mind at his home in Burano, Venice, in 2004. There was no brief beyond an idea of length and a demand for six cabins". Starck is quoted as saying "That was the beauty of the project and the beauty and intelligence of the owner, he just left me completely free," and the article notes that "[his] intention was to make her blend with the sea, to have her live [...] in 'harmony' with the elements. He became obsessed with the way the yacht moved through the water, with barely a ripple, “like a whale”".

In common with many superyachts, little was known about A when it was first commissioned. Builder Blohm + Voss issued a press release in December 2004 identifying the vessel as Project Sigma, which was how it became most commonly known during its construction. While conceptual designer Philippe Starck and project manager Neil Wade were credited personally, and naval architect Martin Francis was the chief technical and naval designer and Starck's partner on the project. Starck was alleged to have taken only three and a half hours to come up with the final shape, whose reverse bow and tumblehome design has drawn parallels with the Zumwalt class of stealth destroyers designed for the US Navy. However, in an interview with Wallpaper magazine, Starck acknowledged it took a month to complete following its commissioning.
 	
It was also stated in the press release that the owner of mega yacht Pelorus — Russian billionaire Roman Abramovich — was not the customer behind Sigma. Nevertheless, because Pelorus was undergoing a concurrent refit at the same shipyard, and because both projects shared the same management company, there was continued speculation that the two vessels had a common owner throughout As construction. Melnichenko was not confirmed as the true owner until after the ship was delivered in July 2008.

In interviews for Yachts International and Die Zeit magazines, Starck gave details of the vessel's most innovative features. Its "purity" was, he said, a reflection of its owner, a "young and brilliant mathematician." Melnichenko, a reputed math prodigy, was not confirmed as the true owner until after the ship was delivered in July 2008. Martin Francis, the boat's naval architect, was also interviewed by Yachts International in 2008, and he too cited the boat's efficiency through the water and her small bow wake as a major innovation. Francis explained that typically the shipyard will do the hull testing, but in As case a model was built and tested in the Solent estuary early in the design process, long prior to the involvement of any builders.

Construction and launch
[[File:Phillippe Starck 2011.jpg|thumb|Conceptual designer Philippe Starck was responsible for As radical silhouette.]]
Project Sigma was given the hull number 970 (she was the 970th build by Blohm + Voss), it was decided that construction would take place at Howaldtswerke-Deutsche Werft (HDW), a sister yard in Kiel also owned by B+V's parent, ThyssenKrupp Marine Systems.

The boat was out of public view for three years, until she presented in an unfinished state for the first time in January 2008. She was provisionally named SF99, as painted on the stern. Six weeks later she emerged again, to perform some brief trials in the waterway adjacent to the shipyard. Finally, in March, the vessel sailed north out of the Kiel Fjord, to perform her first sea trials off the coast of Rügen in the Baltic Sea.

Prior to delivery, the yacht was finally christened A in May 2008. The name “A” was used in order make the vessel appear first on shipping registries, while an artful report in the Sunday Times claimed it was "so that nothing can precede her in the list of the world’s greatest vessels". Once delivered, A'''s maiden voyage took her to Kristiansand in southern Norway, where the new owners collected three Claude Monet paintings they had recently purchased.

When completed, A was the sixth-largest privately owned motor yacht in the world, although by 2011 the construction of newer and larger vessels had relegated her from the top ten. At the time of its launch many commentators made note of the fact that Melnichenko's vessel was slightly bigger than Roman Abramovich's Pelorus, and talk of boat-building one-upmanship between the two oligarchs was fuelled further when Abramovich launched an even bigger yacht, Eclipse, in 2010.

Typically for a mega yacht, A is decorated, equipped, and staffed to an extremely opulent standard. There is almost  of interior space, including  for the master suite. Starck, known for his occasionally risqué design choices, also added a secret room hidden behind mirrored panels. Mirrored surfaces feature extensively throughout the interior, along with Baccarat crystal which is used not only for the glassware and tableware, but for the furniture too. There are 7 guest cabins, although they have moving walls and can be converted to four larger staterooms. Above-deck there is a helipad and swimming pool forward of the superstructure and two more pools aft, one of which is glass-bottomed and can be viewed from the below-deck disco.

35 staff are employed on the vessel. Reportedly, security is tightly controlled, with -thick bomb-proof glass in the windows, over 40 CCTV cameras, motion sensors, biometric fingerprint/keypad entry for restricted areas, and a rumoured escape pod in case of emergencies.

Aside from the yacht itself, the two main tenders—one open and one covered—and a third sports tender have also been designed by Starck, and built by Vaudrey Miller of New Zealand. The total cost of A has never been officially confirmed, but $300 million has been the most frequently cited estimate.

Reception
The exterior design of A, which designer Starck had likened to being "more like a fish than a building", polarized opinions from the outset. Jonathan Beckett, chief executive of London yacht brokers Burgess, was initially skeptical, but changed his mind after seeing the boat in person in the Caribbean: "I have to say I was impressed. It's a very exciting boat to watch. It's simply unlike anything that's ever been done before." David Pelly of Boat International was also enamoured, saying she was "the most extraordinary yacht launched in recent memory." And writing about the world's biggest mega yachts in The New York Times in 2011, Nazanin Lankarini argued that A was "even more desirable [than] her larger sisters by virtue of lines reminiscent of a nuclear submarine". A was one of the featured vessels in the 2011 edition of The Superyachts, where she was described as "bold and eccentric."

By contrast, Power & Motoryacht magazine columnist Diane Byrne opined that "overall she does not float my boat [...] but I do quite like the inverted bow design", while Donald Starkey, a British yacht designer, commented that A "is aggressive, like a giant finger pointing at you. It seems to have nothing to do with the whole idea of yachting, which is about cruising around at a leisurely pace, and enjoying your friends and the sea". Maritime commentator Peter Mello was even more scathing in his assessment, deriding her as "one of the most hideous vessels ever to sail the seas".The Wall Street Journals Robert Frank was initially also an outspoken critic, calling A "one of the ghastliest megayachts ever created" and "more like a cruiser for Darth Vader's navy than a family pleasure boat for the Mediterranean" when she was launched. However, in a follow-up blog several months later, he confessed: "I've gained a bit more respect for it. Technically, it's impressive: Because of her "ax bow," the boat barely makes a splash in the front when it's speeding along at 24 knots. And it's different in a way few yachts are. [...] So even though I still think it's a monster, A'' gets a tip of the hat for taking a risk and being different".

See also
List of motor yachts by length
A (sailing yacht)

References

Motor yachts
2008 ships
Ships built in Kiel